Seagull management is a management style wherein a manager only interacts with employees when they deem a problem has arisen. The perception is that such a management style involves hasty decisions about things of which they have little understanding, resulting in a messy situation with which others must deal. The term became popular through a joke in Ken Blanchard’s 1985 book Leadership and the One Minute Manager: "Seagull managers fly in, make a lot of noise, dump on everyone, then fly out."

See also

References 

Management theory
Metaphors referring to birds